USS Jaydee III (SP-692) was a United States Navy patrol vessel in commission from 1917 to 1919.

Jaydee III was built in 1916 as a private motorboat of the same name by the Matthews Boat Company at Port Clinton, Ohio. On 19 May 1917 or in June 1917, the U.S. Navy acquired her from her owners - R. Talbot, J. C. Wright, Howard Wilson, and Irving Chapin, of Lincoln, Nebraska - for use as a section patrol vessel during World War I. She was commissioned as USS Jaydee III (SP-692) at Detroit, Michigan, on 12 June 1917.

Assigned to the 9th, 10th, and 11th Naval Districts - at the time a single administration entity created by the amalgamation of the 9th Naval District, 10th Naval District, and 11th Naval District - and based at Detroit,  Jaydee III served as a patrol craft and shipping traffic regulator on the Detroit River for the rest of World War I.

Jaydee III was returned to her owners on 7 March 1919.

Notes

References

Department of the Navy Naval History and Heritage Command Online Library of Selected Images: Civilian Ships: Jaydee III (Motor Boat, 1916); Later USS Jaydee III (SP-692), 1917-1919
NavSource Online: Section Patrol Craft Photo Archive: Jaydee III (SP 692)

Patrol vessels of the United States Navy
World War I patrol vessels of the United States
Ships built in Port Clinton, Ohio
1916 ships
Great Lakes ships